The Peloncillo Mountains of Hidalgo County, (Spanish language pelo, hair, pelón, hairless, bald; peloncillo, Little Baldy), is a major  long mountain range southwest of New Mexico's Hidalgo County, and also part of the New Mexico Bootheel region. The range continues to the northwest into Arizona as the Peloncillo Mountains of Cochise County, Arizona. The extreme southwest corner of the range also lies in Arizona. It is a linear range bordering the linear San Bernardino Valley of southeast Cochise County, Arizona.

The Peloncillo Mountains lie in a region of southeast Arizona, southwest New Mexico, northeast Sonora, and extreme northwest Chihuahua called the Madrean Sky Islands. They are tall mountain ranges isolated by surrounding flatlands and valleys with sky islands of isolated fauna and flora. Various corridors exist between some ranges; others are mostly isolated. Some ranges are lower elevation, with a reduced variety of habitats.

Description
The Peloncillo Mountains are mostly north-south trending, but curving northeasterly at the north end. They parallel the southwesterly-by-northeast San Bernardino Valley of Arizona, with various canyons and washes draining into the valley.

Historical battles, and Indian Wars caused retreat into this mountain region; it was also access and escape routes into the safe haven ranges of northern Mexico.

The region is famous for Skeleton Canyon and the historical events that occurred there.

The Baker Canyon Wilderness is located just south in the connected mountain range, the Guadalupe Mountains.

Gallery

See also
Skeleton Canyon Massacre
Skeleton Canyon treasure

References 
Gray Mountain, Peakbagger
Gray Mountain, summitpost.org, "New Mexico 1K Prominence Peaks, (elev. and coordinates)

External links

The Chiricahua-Peloncillo Region
Chiricahua-Peloncillo Region–2-Maps: Black Hills, Peloncillo Mountains, etc.
Antelope Pass Study Area (central-northern Peloncillos of Hidalgo County) with geology explanations and some mountain/hillside photos

Mountain ranges of New Mexico
Mountain ranges of Hidalgo County, New Mexico
New Mexico Bootheel
Mountain ranges of Cochise County, Arizona
Mountain ranges of Arizona
Madrean Sky Islands mountain ranges